Pedro Calles (born 24 August 1983) is a Spanish basketball coach who is the current head coach of the EWE Baskets Oldenburg. Born in Córdoba, he has coached in both Spain and Germany since 2010.

Career
After growing up in Córdoba, Calles graduated in Sports Science in Granada.

In 2012, Calles moved to Germany to work for Artland Dragons, first as athletic trainer and a year later as assistant coach. In 2015, he moved to Rasta Vechta. After the team promoted from the ProA in 2017–18, Calles was named head coach of the team. In the 2018–19 season, Calles had the most successful season ever in the history of Vechta. The team reached the semifinals of the playoffs, eliminating Brose Bamberg in the quarterfinals. Calles was named the Basketball Bundesliga Coach of the Year.

In the 2019–20 season, Calles made his European coaching debut in the Basketball Champions League campaign with Rasta.

On 26 June 2020, Calles signed a two-year contract as head coach of Hamburg Towers. He guided the Hamburg team to two consecutive quarterfinal appearances in the German Bundesliga. In May 2022, he inked a three-year deal with fellow Bundesliga side EWE Baskets Oldenburg.

References

1983 births
Hamburg Towers coaches
Sportspeople from Córdoba, Spain
SC Rasta Vechta coaches
Spanish basketball coaches
Living people